Gian Vincenzo de' Giuli (died 19 January 1672) was a Roman Catholic prelate who served as Bishop of Massa Lubrense (1645–1672).

Biography
On 15 May 1645, Gian Vincenzo de' Giuli was appointed by Pope Innocent X as Bishop of Massa Lubrense.
On 21 May 1645, he was consecrated bishop by Giulio Cesare Sacchetti, Cardinal-Priest of Santa Susanna, with Alessandro Castracani, Bishop of Fano, and Papirio Silvestri, Bishop of Macerata e Tolentino, serving as co-consecrators. 
He served as Bishop of Massa Lubrense until his death on 19 January 1672.

References

External links and additional sources
 (for Chronology of Bishops) 
 (for Chronology of Bishops) 

1672 deaths
17th-century Italian Roman Catholic bishops
Bishops appointed by Pope Innocent X